Zakutskoye is a rural locality (a selo) and the administrative center of Zakutchanskoye Rural Settlement, Veydelevsky District, Belgorod Oblast, Russia. The population was 647 as of 2010. There are 8 streets.

Geography 
Zakutskoye is located 17 km east of Veydelevka (the district's administrative centre) by road. Shevtsov is the nearest rural locality.

References 

Rural localities in Veydelevsky District